Visma is a privately held company headquartered in Oslo, Norway, that provides business software and information technology-related development and consultancy. The majority of the company is owned by HgCapital, a private equity firm.

The company was formed in 1996 in Norway, through the merging of Multisoft, SpecTec and Dovre Information Systems. The group comprises five business areas: SMB, enterprise, custom solutions, cloud infrastructure services, and commerce solutions. Services also include web-based accounting and invoicing, and customer relationship management. 

The Visma group operates across the entire Nordic region along with Benelux, Central and Eastern Europe.

Øystein Moan (CEO -2020) 
Visma CEO, Øystein Moan (born 1959), earned an MSc in computer science at the University of Oslo. Prior to Visma, Moan was the founder and managing director of Cinet AS. After becoming CEO of the Visma Group in 1997, he grew the company from 300 to 8,500 employees and increased the revenue from NOK 250 million to NOK 11,389 million (2018 figures).

In 2020, Moan was succeeded by Merete Hverven.

Corporate history 
1996: The Visma Group has its first year of operations and was listed on the Oslo Stock Exchange. Shortly after listing, Visma started operating as a public company. MultiSoft ASA, SpecTec ASA and Dovre Information Systems AS merge. Three key products: SpecTec (marine), Visma Logistics and Visma Business.

1997: Due to growth ambitions that exceeded the company's resources, the company experienced a financial crisis in the year's second quarter. The company had to be re-financed and re-structured, and most of the management and the Board of Directors were replaced. The turnaround: Øystein Moan joins as CEO, and a new strategy is put into action. The new board manages to raise MNOK100 in new share-capital, but must lay off 1/3 of staff.

1999: Visma establishes subsidiaries in Denmark and United Kingdom. The company makes its first step towards SaaS launching Visma Business e-commerce and starting work on developing web and WAP extensions of all the Visma applications.

2000: The major event of 2000 was the sale of Visma Marine ASA's operations to Dutch company Station12. Visma received a cash payment of MNOK730. The considerable financial resources would be used to generate vigorous growth. New strategy: To offer both software and outsourcing within accounting, finance and payroll.

2001: Visma acquires Spcs, the Swedish market leader within the small business segment. Later in the year, the company enters the Finnish market through the acquisition of Liinos.

2002: With the Spcs developed software “Avendo”, Visma enters the Norwegian micro market. The BPO division enters the Danish market through the acquisition of Bogholderi & Administrasjon, and the acquisition of Møre Datasystemer sees Visma enter the public sector.

2003: Visma enters major cooperation agreements with Norway's largest bank (DNB) and the national postal service.

2004: Visma establishes an electronic data center in Oslo, which processed 2 million incoming invoices in 2005. The company also makes big strides in the public sector with debt collection and temp services added to the portfolio.

2005: Steady growth – both organically and through eleven acquisition. Visma's Management Trainee program is initiated.

2006–2008: Visma enters the Dutch market through the acquisition of software company AccountView. A change of ownership sees British private equity firm HgCapital become the new majority owner. HgCapital de-lists Visma from the Oslo Stock Exchange.

2009: The company's Retail IT division is established, providing retail businesses with hardware and implementation to consultancy and support. This is also the year Visma's signature headquarter building in Skøyen, Oslo is completed ready to house 800 + of the company's Norwegian staff. Visma reaches 10,000 SaaS users and becomes Finland's second largest accounting firm.

2010: KKR acquires a 76.9% ownership in Visma. At the time, the transaction values Visma at an enterprise value of NOK11 billion. Visma was KKR's first investment in Norway. HgCapital, the previous majority owner of Visma, retained a significant minority ownership of 17.7% Management of Visma increased its ownership in the business to 5.3%.
Earlier that year, Visma entered the IT consultancy market in Norway, Sweden and Denmark through the acquisition of Sirius IT.

2011: In Norway, Visma acquires Mamut, its rival in the micro segment. Included in the acquisition is international web hosting company Active24.

2012: Visma launches Visma.net – for small and medium-sized businesses. At launch, the suite includes ERP, CRM and Expense Management. Later this year, Visma introduces Net Promoter Score – a renowned customer satisfaction and nurturing program.

2013: Visma signs its biggest deal to date to develop admin and communication solution for Norwegian schools. Through the acquisition of the Duetto Group, Visma enters the Finnish debt collection market.

2014: Visma widens its shareholder base to include Cinven and is valued at NOK21 billion. The new owner structure becomes Cinven, HgCapital and KKR with 31.3% ownership each, and the Visma management with 6% ownership.

2015: Visma establishes a new business unit – Visma Employee Management – dedicated to payroll and HRM outsourcing services. Visma also conducts several major acquisitions: e-conomic (DK), SpeedLedger (SE), Huldt & Lillevik(NO), PBJ (DK), Viklo Oy (FI), Aditro Public (SE), Digital Booker (FI) and Abalon (SE).

2016: Visma sells its BPO-division (outsourced accounting, payroll and HR services) to HgCapital to focus on its position as a cloud software company for business customers. Visma also acquires 20+ cloud software companies all over Europe.

2017: Through acquiring Bluegarden, Visma's largest acquisition to date, the company gains a significant position in the Danish payroll segment. During the year, Visma acquires a total of 12 companies, among them Admincontrol, Megaflex Oy and NYCE solutions, expanding its offering in several new business areas.

In June 2017, Visma's shareholder structure changes after KKR sells its entire remaining stake in Visma to an investor group led by HgCapital together with GIC, Montagu and ICG.

2018: Visma acquires Raet, a large Dutch enterprise providing payroll and HCM (Human Capital Management) software.

2019: Visma had a total turnover of NOK 16,500,000,000.

2020: Visma acquires Yuki, a Dutch bookkeeping software platform.

2021: Visma acquires ProSaldo.net, an Austrian bookkeeping and billing software platform, and Holded, a Spanish ERP and accounting company.

2022: Visma acquires Dutch financial software company Lyanthe and Belgian software developers IonProjects and Teamleader. In May 2022, Visma announced the acquisition of Danish time registration system Intempus. 

2023: Visma acquires German financial software companies H&H and Buchungsbutler.

Sponsorship 
Visma has been the title sponsor of Visma Ski Classics, a long distance ski championship, since 2015.

In 2018, Visma signed a five-year sponsorship deal with the professional road cycling team Team-Jumbo Visma, which currently is one of the teams competing in the UCI World Tour. As Visma will be one of the team's two name sponsors, the team has entered the 2019 season under its new name Team Jumbo-Visma. The team won the 2022 Tour de France with Jonas Vingegaard and took the Green Jersey (sprinter jersey) with Wout van Aert. It also took the Green Jersey in Le Tour de France Femmes avec Zwift with Marianne Vos.

References

Companies based in Oslo
Companies formerly listed on the Oslo Stock Exchange
Customer relationship management software companies
ERP software companies
Kohlberg Kravis Roberts companies
Software companies of Norway
1996 establishments in Norway